Stacey Kade (also known as Stacey Klemstein and S.A. Barnes) is an American author from Chicago, Illinois.

Career
Kade is the author of The Ghost and The Goth, Queen of The Dead, and Body & Soul. In 2011 her book Queen of The Dead was nominated for a YALSA award for "Best Fiction for Young Adults". She announced in February 2011 that she begin writing a new book series called Project Paper Doll. The first book Project Paper Doll: THE RULES was released in 2013. The second book Project Paper Doll: THE HUNT was released in 2014. the third book Project Paper Doll: The Trials was released in 2015.

Personal life
Growing up her parents were a minister and a music teacher. Before becoming an author she was an award-winning corporate copywriter. She lives in the Chicago suburbs with her husband and 2 retired racing greyhounds.

Books

As Stacey Klemstein

As Stacey Kade
 
 
 
 
 
 Project Paper Doll: The Trials. New York: Disney-Hyperion. 2015. .
 
 
 For This Life Only. Simon & Schuster BFYR. 2016. .
 Starlight Nights. Forge Books. 2018. .
 Finding Felicity. Simon & Schuster Books For Young Readers. 2018. .

As S.A. Barnes

References

External links 
 Stacey Kade's Website
 Website as Stacey Klemstein
 Twitter
 Works by Stacey Kade in libraries (WorldCat catalog)

Living people
21st-century American novelists
21st-century American women writers
American fantasy writers
American science fiction writers
American women novelists
Women science fiction and fantasy writers
American writers of young adult literature
Women writers of young adult literature
Writers from Chicago
Valparaiso University alumni
Novelists from Illinois
Year of birth missing (living people)